The 1996–97 European Challenge Cup pool stage was the opening stage of the first season of the European Challenge Cup, the second-tier competition for European rugby union clubs. Matches took place between 12 October and 2 November 1996.

Twenty-four teams participated in this phase of the competition; they were divided into four pools of six teams each, with each team playing the other teams in their pool once only. Teams were awarded two points for a win and one point for a draw. The winner and runner-up of each pool progressed to the knockout stage of the tournament. These teams then competed in a single-elimination tournament that ended with the final at the Stade de la Méditerranée in Béziers, France on 26 January 1997.

Results

Pool 1

Pool 2

 The Treorchy v Bridgend match was not played.

Pool 3

Pool 4

Qualifiers

See also
European Challenge Cup
1996–97 Heineken Cup

References

pool stage
1996-97